Dahab is a 1953 Egyptian Comedy musical film directed by Anwar Wagdy, starring the 10-year-old wunderkind Fayrouz alongside Wagdy in one of the most important films of her career.

Cast
 Anwar Wagdy as Wahid Alfonso
 Fayrouz as Dahab
 Magda as adult Dahab
 Ismail Yassine as Farah, the theatre owner
 Zeinat Sedki as Baltia
 Seraj Munir as Mounir El Dinary, Dahab's father
 Mimi Shoukeib as Mounir El Dinary's wife

See also
 Cinema of Egypt
 Lists of Egyptian films
 List of Egyptian films of the 1950s
 List of Egyptian films of 1953

References

External links
 
 Dahab on elCinema.com

1950s Arabic-language films
1953 films
1953 musical comedy films
Egyptian musical comedy films
Egyptian black-and-white films
Films shot in Egypt